Box of Dreams (French: La boîte aux rêves) is a 1945 French comedy drama film directed by Yves Allégret and Jean Choux and starring Viviane Romance, Henri Guisol and Frank Villard. Simone Signoret had a small role in the film but would go on to marry Allégret and make several films with him which would contribute to her rise to stardom.

Filming originally began in 1943 during the Italian occupation of France but was not released until after the end of the Second World War. The film's sets were designed by the art directors Auguste Capelier and Georges Wakhévitch. It was shot at the Cimex-controlled Saint-Laurent-du-Var Studios on the outskirts of Nice. The film had admissions of 2,792 in France.

Cast
 Viviane Romance as Nicole Payen-Laurel
 Henri Guisol as Pierre Forestier
 Frank Villard as Jean 
 René Lefèvre as Marc
 Pierre Palau as Payen-Laurel
 Roland Armontel as Amédée
 Gisèle Alcée as Gisèle - la nouvelle bonne des quatre bohèmes
 Henri Bry as Pépito
 Mathilde Casadesus as L'Agitée
 Léonce Corne as Le parent
 Pierre-Louis as Alain
 Marguerite Pierry as Tante Lucie
 Robert Pizani as Oncle André
 Gaston Orbal as M. Lafont
 Simone Signoret as Une femme 
 Gérard Philipe as Un homme

References

Bibliography
 Hayward, Susan. Simone Signoret: The Star as Cultural Sign. Continuum, 2004.

External links
Box of Dreams at IMDb

1945 films
French comedy-drama films
1945 comedy-drama films
French black-and-white films
1940s French-language films
Films directed by Yves Allégret
Films directed by Jean Choux
1940s French films